Diatraea gaga is a moth in the family Crambidae. It was described by Harrison Gray Dyar Jr. in 1914. It is found in Panama and Guyana.

References

Chiloini
Moths described in 1914